Ala ol Din-e Olya (also Romanized as ʿAlā ol Dīn-e ‘Olyā; also known as ʿAlā ol Dīnī-ye ‘Olyā (Persian: علاالديني عليا) and ʿAlāeddīn-e ‘Olyā) is a village in Eslamabad Rural District, in the Central District of Jiroft County, Kerman Province, Iran. At the 2006 census, its population was 786, in 168 families.

References 

Populated places in Jiroft County